Georg Wilhelm Timm, also known as Vasily Fyodorovich Timm (Russian: Василий Фёдорович Тимм; 21 June 1820, in Riga – 19 April 1895, in Berlin) was a Baltic-German painter, lithographer and ceramic designer, known for his genre and battle scenes.

Biography 

His father, Friedrich Gottfried Timm (1779-1848), was the mayor of Riga. His sister, Emilie, married the painter Karl Bryullov in 1839. His first art studies were in Riga, then he went to Saint Petersburg, where he enrolled as a "foreign student" at the Imperial Academy of Arts. His primary instructor there was the battle painter, Alexander Sauerweid.

He was awarded two silver medals and graduated in 1839 with the title of "Artist". Five years later, thanks to an Imperial scholarship, he went to Paris where he worked under the direction of Horace Vernet, also a battle painter, and made a visit to Algiers. Upon his return to Paris, he began exhibiting at the Salon where he attracted critical praise.

The onset of the French Revolution of 1848 forced him to return to Saint Petersburg, where he was initially employed as an illustrator; notably for the works of Faddey Bulgarin and Nikolay Gretsch. He worked primarily in the media of lithography and woodcuts and was sometimes referred to as the "Russian Gavarni".

He travelled extensively throughout Russia, serving as a battle painter during the second phase of the Caucasian War. In 1852, he accompanied Tsar Nicholas I on a visit to Finland . Later, he made sketches at the Siege of Sevastopol. As a result, in 1855, he was named an "Academician" by the Imperial Academy.

From 1851 to 1862, by leave of the Royal Family, he published the Russian Art Gazette, which featured works by many prominent Russian artists, made into lithographs by Timm. He had to stop publishing the gazette when he began to suffer from an eye disease.

In 1867, he moved to Berlin to seek treatment and took up a position as the Director of a privately operated ceramics institute. He never returned to Russia. In 1876, he was appointed a Professor at the Prussian Academy of Arts and began working at the Royal Porcelain Factory. After his death, his widow donated his estate to the Riga City Art Museum. A major retrospective was held at their new building in 1906.

Selected paintings

References

Further reading
 Julius Genss, Briefe Wilhelm Timm's an seinen Vater aus den Jahren 1841-1846, Selbstverlag des Herausgebers, 1931

External links 

Paintings by Vasily Timm

1820 births
1895 deaths
19th-century painters from the Russian Empire
Russian male painters
Artists from the Russian Empire
Russian military personnel of the Crimean War
Baltic-German people
Military art
German ceramists
Academic staff of the Prussian Academy of Arts
Russian emigrants to Germany
Russian illustrators
Artists from Riga
19th-century male artists from the Russian Empire